XGMML (the eXtensible Graph Markup and Modeling Language) is an XML application based on GML which is used for graph description. Technically, while GML is not related to XML nor SGML, XGMML is an XML application that is so designed that there's a 1:1 relation towards GML for trivial conversion between the two formats.

Applications supporting XGMML 
 Cytoscape, an open source bioinformatics software platform for visualizing molecular interaction networks, loads and saves networks and node/edge attributes in XGMML
 Biomax BioXM Knowledge Management Environment, a customizable knowledge management system for life sciences, supports export of semantic network graphs as XGMML files
 JNets, a network visualization and analysis tool.

See also 
 LOGML, a markup language enabling data mining for web server logs. LOGML is derived from XGMML.

External links 
XGMML Reference (archived copy, original link offline)

XML markup languages
Computer file formats
Graph description languages